The Philosophical Notebooks of Lenin were a series of summaries and commentaries on philosophical works by Lenin. Included were works by Aristotle, Hegel, Feuerbach, Marx, and Deborin. Lenin's notes on dialectics played an influential role in Soviet and Chinese studies on contradiction and the unity of opposites. The Notebooks are often contrasted by scholars with Lenin's Materialism and Empirio-criticism. 

The proper interpretation of the notebooks would play a major role in the Mechanist debate of the 1920s in the USSR and the One Divides Into Two controversy of 1964 in China.

See also 

 Vladimir Lenin bibliography

External links
 Philosophical Notebooks by Vladimir Lenin at the Marxists Internet Archive

1918 non-fiction books
Communist books
Works by Vladimir Lenin
Books about revolutions
Philosophical literature